Wilhelmine Ullmayer (1846-1890) was a stage actor. She was engaged at the Estates Theatre in Prague in 1874-1890, where she belonged to the theatre's star attractions. She was known for her roles a soubrette and operetta singer.

References 

 Ullmayer, Wilhelmine; encyklopedie.idu.cz

1846 births
1890 deaths
19th-century Czech actors